Ian King may refer to:

Ian King (businessman) (born 1956), BAE Systems executive
Ian King (Australian cricketer) (born 1943), former Australian first-class cricketer
Ian King (English cricketer) (born 1931), former English first-class cricketer
Ian King (footballer) (1937–2016), Scottish footballer and former Leicester City player
Ian King (journalist), English journalist